Glengarriff GAA Irish: Cumann Lúthchleas Gael An Gleann Garbh is a Gaelic football club in Glengarriff, County Cork. It is in the Beara division of Cork GAA. They play in green and red colours and their home pitch is Páirc Garbh. The club fields U-21, minor and junior teams and underage teams from U-8 to U-16

Achievements
 Cork Junior B Football Championship Winners 1999  Runners-Up 1997
 Beara Junior Football Championship Winners 2009

References

External links
Official Glengarriff GAA Club website

Gaelic games clubs in County Cork
Gaelic football clubs in County Cork